Ferdinand Eberstadt may refer to:
Ferdinand Eberstadt (mayor) (1808–1888), first Jewish mayor in Germany
Ferdinand Eberstadt (policy advisor) (1890–1969), American policy advisor